Bawcomville is an unincorporated community and census-designated place in Ouachita Parish, Louisiana, United States. Its population was 3,588 as of the 2010 census.

Geography

Prior to 2010, the Census Bureau included both Bawcomville and Brownsville in the Brownsville-Bawcomville census-designated place for statistical purposes.

Demographics

2020 census

As of the 2020 United States census, there were 3,472 people, 1,270 households, and 614 families residing in the CDP.

References

Unincorporated communities in Ouachita Parish, Louisiana
Unincorporated communities in Louisiana
Census-designated places in Ouachita Parish, Louisiana
Census-designated places in Louisiana